Wiig is a surname of Norwegian origin (a variant of Vik), and may refer to:

Alf Wiig (1891–1974), a Norwegian minister and bishop
Andreas Wiig (born 1981), Norwegian professional snowboarder
Arne Wiig (born 1964), Swedish priest, poet, author, playwright
Aud Marit Wiig (born 1953), Norwegian diplomat.
Kristen Wiig (born 1973), American actress and comedian
Marit Wiig (born 1949), Norwegian civil servant and organizational leader
Martin Wiig (born 1983), Norwegian football striker
Olaf Wiig (born 1975), New Zealand cameraman who was kidnapped by Palestinian gunmen
Steven Wiig (born 1972), American musician and actor

Norwegian-language surnames